Lesura Cove (‘Zaliv Lesura’ \'za-liv le-'su-ra\) is the 1.97 km wide cove indenting for 1.2 km the south coast of Two Hummock Island in the Palmer Archipelago, Antarctica.  It is entered west of Veyka Point.

The point is named after the settlement of Lesura in Northwestern Bulgaria.

Location
British mapping in 1978.

Maps
 British Antarctic Territory.  Scale 1:200000 topographic map.  DOS 610 Series, Sheet W 64 60.  Directorate of Overseas Surveys, UK, 1978.
 Antarctic Digital Database (ADD). Scale 1:250000 topographic map of Antarctica. Scientific Committee on Antarctic Research (SCAR). Since 1993, regularly upgraded and updated.

References
 Bulgarian Antarctic Gazetteer. Antarctic Place-names Commission. (details in Bulgarian, basic data in English)
 Lesura Cove. SCAR Composite Antarctic Gazetteer.

External links
 Lesura Cove. Copernix satellite image

Coves of Graham Land
Bulgaria and the Antarctic
Two Hummock Island